This page is a list of hyperboloid structures. These were first applied in architecture by Russian engineer Vladimir Shukhov (1853–1939). Shukhov built his first example as a water tower (hyperbolic shell) for the 1896 All-Russian Exposition. Subsequently, more have been designed by other architects, including Le Corbusier, Antoni Gaudí, Eduardo Torroja, Oscar Niemeyer and Ieoh Ming Pei.

The shapes are doubly ruled surfaces, which can be classed as:
 Hyperbolic paraboloids, such as saddle roofs
 Hyperboloid of one sheet, such as cooling towers

Notable projects

Notable Projects Never Built

Gallery of more hyperbolic paraboloid structures

Gallery of more hyperboloid structures

Gallery of hyperboloid ship masts

See also

Notes

Structural system
Hyperboloid structures